Milton Gonçalves (9 December 1933 – 30 May 2022) was a Brazilian actor and television director, who was one of the most famous black actors in Brazil, having collaborated twice with acclaimed director Héctor Babenco. One notable role with Babenco was that alongside William Hurt and Raul Julia as a police chief in Kiss of the Spider Woman.

He worked in many telenovelas, including A Cabana do Pai Tomás, Irmãos Coragem, O Bem-Amado, Pecado Capital, Baila Comigo, Partido Alto, Mandala, Felicidade, A Favorita, and Lado a Lado. He also worked as director in O Bem-Amado and Escrava Isaura.

Career
Gonçalves began his career in São Paulo, in an amateur group. As he moved to a professional group, he met Augusto Boal, who was looking for an actor to play an old black man. Joining Boal's Teatro de Arena, Milton Gonçalves found an open environment for political, philosophical, and artistic discussion, where he was not discriminated against on the baseless basis of his race.

Gonçalves wrote four plays, one of which was staged by the Teatro Experimental do Negro and directed by Dalmo Ferreira. He said of this engagement "There I learnt everything I know about Theater. It was fundamental for my comprehension of the world."

A Black Movement activist, Milton Gonçalves tried a political career, in the 1990s, as a candidate to Rio de Janeiro state governorship.

Father of actor Maurício Gonçalves, he was married to Oda Gonçalves from 1966 until her death in 2013.

Death
Gonçalves died in Rio de Janeiro on 30 May 2022, at the age of 88, from complications of a stroke he had suffered two years earlier.

Selected filmography
 2012 - Lado a Lado
 2011 - The Silver Cliff
 2011 - Zorra Total
 2011 - Fina Estampa
 2011 - Assalto ao Banco Central
 2011 - Insensato Coração
 2009 - Força-Tarefa
 2008 - A Favorita
 2006 - Cobras & Lagartos
 2005 - América
 2003 - Carandiru
 2002 - Esperança
 1999 - Orfeu
 1997 - Four Days in September
 1997 - Por Amor
 1996 - O Rei do Gado
 1995 - Irmãos Coragem
 1992 - Kickboxer 3
 1989 - Wild Orchid
 1988 - Moon over Parador
 1987 - Subway to the Stars
 1986 - Sinhá Moça
 1985 - Kiss of the Spider Woman
 1984 - Quilombo
 1977 - Lucio Flavio
 1976 - Carioca tigre
 1973 - O Bem-Amado
 1972 - Vila Sésamo
 1968 - O Bravo Guerreiro
 1960 - Cidade Ameaçada

References

External links
 
 Milton Gonçalves Bio

1933 births
2022 deaths
People from Minas Gerais
Afro-Brazilian people
Afro-Brazilian male actors
Brazilian male telenovela actors
Brazilian male film actors
Brazilian male voice actors
Brazilian male dramatists and playwrights
20th-century Brazilian male actors
20th-century Brazilian male writers
21st-century Brazilian male actors
21st-century Brazilian male writers
20th-century Brazilian dramatists and playwrights
21st-century Brazilian dramatists and playwrights
Recipients of the Order of Cultural Merit (Brazil)